Collins is an unincorporated community in Smith Township, Whitley County, in the U.S. state of Indiana. It is commonly referred to as a 'ghost town', however this is untrue; Collins just has a very low population and once contained an abandoned school, a General Store, and a Mint mill that processed locally grown peppermint. Collins was also a major grower of Onions, and the Vandalia Railroad shipped tons of onions to national markets.

History

Collins was platted in 1872, and was named after James Collins, a railroad official.

A post office was established at Collins in 1872, and remained in operation until it was discontinued in 1913.

Geography

References

Unincorporated communities in Whitley County, Indiana
Unincorporated communities in Indiana
Fort Wayne, IN Metropolitan Statistical Area